Jeremy Ranch is a community within the Summit Park census-designated place in Summit County, Utah, United States.

Description
East Canyon Creek flows northwest through the community and on through East Canyon.

The community has the well known Jeremy Ranch Golf Course, which was designed by Arnold Palmer. The Jeremy Ranch Elementary School (of the Park City School District) is located within the community.

References

External links
 Jeremy Ranch Golf & Country Club (official website)
 Jeremy Ranch Elementary School (official website)

Populated places in Summit County, Utah